Arnošt Nejedlý (22 May 1883 – 1917) was a Czech long-distance runner. He competed for Bohemia in the men's marathon at the 1908 Summer Olympics.

References

External links
 
 

1883 births
1917 deaths
Athletes (track and field) at the 1906 Intercalated Games
Athletes (track and field) at the 1908 Summer Olympics
Czech male long-distance runners
Czech male marathon runners
Olympic athletes of Bohemia
Place of birth missing
Sportspeople from the Austro-Hungarian Empire